Porella is a large, common, and widespread genus of liverworts in order Porellales. It is a member of the family Porellaceae within that order. There are 84 species recognized, most of them from East Asia. The genus has a wide distribution in temperate areas, where it is commonly found growing attached to the bark of trees. Members of the genus have lobed leaves with a large upper lobe and small lower lobe.

Species 
The following species are recognised in the genus Porella:
 Porella arboris-vitae 
 Porella bolanderi 
 Porella cordeana 
 Porella navicularis 
 Porella pinnata 
 Porella platyphylla
 Porella roellii

References

External links 

Porellales
Porellales genera
Taxa named by Carl Linnaeus
Taxa described in 1753